El Paso & Southwestern Railroad No. 1 is a 4-4-0 type steam locomotive, preserved in El Paso, Texas. The engine was built in 1857 by Breese, Kneeland, and Company of Jersey City, New Jersey, and is the only locomotive built by that firm still in existence.

Working life
It was a wood burner built for the Milwaukee & Mississippi Railroad Company in 1857 as their No. 40 and named Spring Green. The Milwaukee & Mississippi became the Milwaukee & Prairie du Chien Railway Company in 1861. The locomotive was renumbered 111 when the M&PdC was sold to the Milwaukee & St Paul Railroad in 1867; the railroad renaming itself The Chicago, Milwaukee & St. Paul Railroad in 1874.

In 1889, the locomotive was sold to the Arizona and Southeastern Railroad Company, as their No. 1, later becoming the El Paso and Southwestern Railroad. It is likely to have been converted to coal burning during this time, thus receiving its current appearance with a straight stack and extended smokebox. EP&SW No. 1 was used to move mine and mill supplies and products when it arrived here in 1902. As El Paso became one of the great rail hubs of the west, timber was brought from Cloudcroft and coal from Dawson, New Mexico.

Preservation
In 1903, it was retired, and around 1909, Locomotive No. 1 was overhauled, painted, and put on display in Downtown El Paso at the intersection of Stanton and Franklin streets. In 1939, the engine was used in the film Let Freedom Ring, starring Nelson Eddy and Virginia Bruce.
 
In 1960, Southern Pacific Railroad donated it to the University of Texas at El Paso who displayed it near the Centennial Museum and Chihuahuan Desert Gardens. The bell clapper was removed because students would ring it to disturb the slumber of residents in nearby dorms. In 1968, El Paso Historical Society and the Junior Chamber of Commerce raised money to build a shelter to protect this important national treasure from the elements.

Restoration

In October 1999, the engine was officially recognized as a National Trust for Historic Preservation Save America’s Treasures project. In 2001 more than $1.1 million of Texas State Transportation Commission and local matching funds were allocated for the removal and restoration of the locomotive. The engine was removed from the Centennial Museum in 2002, and placed in a warehouse where it was cosmetically restored. As part of the restoration work, the bell clapper was returned on June 20, 2002, and reinstalled. The restored engine was placed in the Railroad and Transportation Museum of El Paso in 2003.

See also
Railroad and Transportation Museum of El Paso

References

Picture of Locomotive No. 1
Rail Photo Art
Proclamation for sesquicentennial
Legislative Library
El Paso Mayor's proclamation
Restoration of the Locomotive
Senate Proclamation

External links
Railroad and Transportation Museum of El Paso
Locomotive No. 1 Slideshow
Visit to the Museum

Southern Pacific Railroad locomotives
Milwaukee Road locomotives
Individual locomotives of the United States
4-4-0 locomotives
Railway locomotives introduced in 1857
Standard gauge locomotives of the United States
1
Preserved steam locomotives of Texas